Rahumäe cemetery is a cemetery located at Rahumäe in Nõmme District, Tallinn, Estonia. This municipal cemetery was established in 1903 on 29 hectares of land to meet the needs of the growing population of Tallinn. A number of congregations are present including a Jewish section established in 1911. This forested cemetery is notable for its many works by famous sculptures and chapels present within its grounds.

Jewish section
Jewish section (also called New Jewish Cemetery) was established in 1911. Its area is about 1 ha.

Notable interments

August Allik (1920–1962), Soviet military commander (et, ru)
Ilmar Aluvee (1969–2013), ski jumper, biathlete and coach 
Gottlieb Ast (1874–1919), politician
Vladimir Beekman (1929–2009), writer, poet and translator
Paul Burman (1888–1934), painter and graphic artist (et, uk)
Erika Esop (1927–1999), writer (et)
Gunnar Graps (1951–2004), drummer and singer
Juhan Jaik (1899–1948), writer and journalist 
Ernst Joll (1902–1935), football player and journalist (et)
Jaan Kalviste (1898–1936), chemist, educator and translator
Jaan Kiivit Sr. (1906–1971), clergyman
Jaan Kiivit Jr. (1940–2005), clergyman
August Kirsimägi (1905–1933), writer (et, de)
Vilhelmine Klementi (1904–1929), communist politician (et, ru)
Aleksander Klumberg (1899–1958), decathlete
Jaan Koort (1883–1935), sculptor, ceramist and painter 
Jaan Kreuks (1891–1923), communist politician (et)
Jaan Kross (1920–2007), writer
Peeter Kurvits (1891–1962), military commander, politician and economist (et)
Jaanus Kuum (1964–1998), racing cyclist
August Lass (1903–1962), footballer
Teodor Lippmaa (1892–1943), botanist
Georg Luiga (1866–1936), journalist and writer (et, fi)
Olaf Luiga (1908–1939), weightlifter
Jakob Mändmets (1871–1930), writer and journalist 
Konstantin Märska (1896–1951), film director
Natalie Mei (1900–1975), painter and graphic artist
Johannes Mülber (1889–1938), photographer and city official (et)
Ellen Niit (1928–2016), children's writer, poet and translator
Jaan Oks (1884–1918), writer (et, de)
Evald Oldekop (1885–1952), hydrologist and biological philosopher (et)
Velda Otsus (1913–2006), ballerina and stage actress
Johannes-Georg Parikas (1880–1958), photographer (et)
Endel Pärn (1914–1990), actor 
Artur Perna (1881–1940), architect and military commander (et, ru)
Aleksander Pürge (1887–1940), politician, engineer, and military officer (lieutenant)
Kristjan Raud (1865–1943), painter and draughtsman
Paul Raud (1865–1930), painter
Jakob Rosenberg (1881–1937), esperantist (et, de, eo)
Jaan Rumma (1887–1926), geographer (et)
Vello Saatpalu (1935–2013), engineer, politician, and sport sailor
Elmar Salulaht (1910–1974), actor and opera singer 
Peep Sarapik (1949–1994), composer and choral conductor (et)
Julius Seljamaa (1883–1936), politician, diplomat and journalist
Venda Tammann (1932–2010), accordionist and music pedagogue (et, fi)
Aleksander Tassa (1882–1955), painter and writer (et, de)
Kalmer Tennosaar (1928–2004), singer and journalist
Heinrich Tiidermann (1863–1904), photographer (et)
Leopold Tõnson (1878–1935), athlete, rower and military commander (et)
Toomas Uba (1943–2000), sports journalist (et)
Marie Under (1883–1980), poet
Agaate Veeber (1901–1988), graphic artist 
Kuno Veeber (1898–1929), painter and graphic artist 
Jakob Westholm (1877–1935), pedagogue

Gallery

See also
List of cemeteries in Estonia

References

External links

Rahumäe cemetery

Cemeteries in Tallinn
1903 establishments in the Russian Empire
1900s establishments in Estonia